Eugamandus jamaicensis is a species of longhorn beetles of the subfamily Lamiinae. It was described by Vitali in 2003, and is known from Jamaica, from which its species epithet is derived.

References

Beetles described in 2003
Endemic fauna of Jamaica
Acanthocinini